Bapu Biru Vategaonkar (1922-2018) was an Indian s
Social worker and youth idol.

Media 
He has been interviewed in the programme "desh yatra" on IBN-Lokmat and on Jai Maharashtra TV.  A bio-pic on Vategaonkar has been made. Milind Gunaji played Vategaonkar's role in the film. The play "Prisoner of Kagal jail that is Bapu Bhiru Vategaonkar" has been set on his life, this play has been produced by Mangala Bansode daughter of Vithabai Bhau Mang Narayangaonkar. Vategaonkar's earlier exploits were mentioned in a news story about a daring escape made by a criminal who escaped from his police escort.

References 

1922 births
2018 deaths
Marathi people
Indian social workers